Alfred Randell (10 May 1884 – 13 September 1958) was an Australian cricketer. He played five first-class matches for Western Australia between 1912/13 and 1921/22.

References

External links
 

1884 births
1958 deaths
Australian cricketers
Western Australia cricketers
Cricketers from Perth, Western Australia